Young Peggy (Child 298) is one of 305 songs in an anthology of ballads from England and Scotland cataloged by American academic Francis James Child during the late 1800s. Known as the Child Ballads, Child's work was published as the 2,500-page book The English and Scottish Popular Ballads.

Plot
The title character Peggy is secretly meeting her lover Jamie against the wishes of her family, who call him a loon and a rogue. The two run off together in the middle of the night. Peggy's father gives chase but by the time he catches up with them, they have already signed the wedding papers.

See also
 List of Child Ballads

References

Child Ballads
Year of song unknown
Song articles with missing songwriters